Foundations and Trends in Econometrics is a peer-reviewed scientific journal that publishes long survey and tutorial articles in the field of econometrics. It was established in 2005 and is published by Now Publishers. The founding editor-in-chief is William H. Greene (New York University).

Abstracting and indexing 
The journal is abstracted and indexed in:

 EconLit
 JEL
 Zentralblatt Math
 MathSciNet
 Google Scholar
 RePEc
 Summon by Serials Solutions
 EBSCO Discovery Service

References

External links 
 

Economics journals
Now Publishers academic journals
Publications established in 2004
Quarterly journals
English-language journals